The cinereous mourner (Laniocera hypopyrra) is a species of bird in the family Tityridae. The term cinereous describes its colouration.  It has traditionally been placed in the cotinga family, but evidence strongly suggest it is better placed in Tityridae, where now placed by SACC.  It is found in Bolivia, Brazil, Colombia, Ecuador, French Guiana, Guyana, Peru, Suriname, and Venezuela.
Its natural habitat is subtropical or tropical moist lowland forests.

French naturalist Louis Jean Pierre Vieillot described the species in 1817.

Nestlings of this species are orange with long filoplumes that end in white tips and have a resemblance to hairy caterpillars of a moth belonging to the family Megalopygidae. The young birds move their heads slowly from side to side which are thought to enhance the impression by resembling a moving caterpillar. It is thought that this may be the first case of Batesian mimicry involving a harmless bird mimic and a toxic insect model, although another species, the elegant mourner (or shrike-like cotinga) (Laniisoma elegans), also has young that share a similar downy appearance; however, detailed observations of the latter are unavailable.

References

cinereous mourner
Birds of the Amazon Basin
Birds of the Guianas
cinereous mourner
Taxa named by Louis Jean Pierre Vieillot
Taxonomy articles created by Polbot